The Polytechnic of Leiria (IPL) is a public institution of Higher Education that offers courses of training on an Undergraduate Degree, Masters, Post-Graduate, Technology Specialization and Preparation Courses for Access to Higher Education level. It began its activity in 1980 and is present in the Leiria and West region through its five schools, divided into five campus, located in the cities of Leiria (School of Education and Social Sciences, School of Technology and Management and School of Health Sciences), Caldas da Rainha (School of Fine Art and Design) and Peniche (School of Tourism and Maritime Technology). IPL offers Undergraduate and master's degrees courses in the areas of: Art and Design, Law studies, Education and Communication, Engineering and Technology and Tourism and Health.

IPL’s Campus 

Campus 1 In IPL's Campus 1, there is the School of Education and Social Sciences (ESECS) which develops its training activity in the areas of Human and Social Sciences, Communication and Teacher Training. It has an enrollment of approximately 1,700 students.

Campus 2 Campus 2 of IPL is based in Leiria. It consists of two schools: the School of Technology and Management (ESTG) and the School Of Health Sciences (ESSLei).

The ESTG offers courses in the areas of engineering and technology and of entrepreneurial and juridical sciences. It is a school recognized for the quality of the education provided and for its strong connection to the enterprise world, not only from the Leiria and West region but also on a national level. The school is attended by approximately 5.600 students. 
The School Of Health Sciences (ESSLei) was integrated in IPL in 2001 and has been intended for the training of nurses and it is predicted that in the next academic year it will widen its training offer to other areas of Health Sciences. It is attended by approximately 800 students.

Campus 3 Campus 3 of IPL is situated in Caldas da Rainha, approximately 60 kilometers South of Leiria. The School of Fine Arts and Design (ESAD.CR) is located in this city, a thermal city that has a vast artistic patrimony. It is a prestigious school in terms of training and art in the areas of Art and Design, having been acknowledged with various national and international awards received by students and teachers. Attended by approximately 1.200 students, ESAD.CR privileges teaching methodologies focused on personal development, creativity and project implementation, stimulating the spirit of initiative.

Campus 4
The School of Maritime Technology (ESTM) is located in IPL's Campus 4, in Peniche (80 kilometers South of Leiria). This school with 1.500 students is especially aimed at the training in the area of Tourism, Marine Biology, Biotechnology and Food Engineering.

Campus 5
In Campus 5, in Leiria, there are other structures of the Institute: the Institute for Research, Development and Advanced Studies (INDEA), the Training Centre for the Courses of Technology Specialization (FOR.CET) with around 900 students, the Centre of New Opportunities (CNO), a Transfer Technology and Information Center (OTIC) and an E-Learning Unit (UED). These are units with specific aims that encompass the investigation and post-graduate training, the post-secondary training, the e-learning, the knowledge transfer, among others.

Undergraduate Degrees 

Fine Arts and Design

Fine Arts (School of Fine Arts and design), Caldas da Rainha

Interior and Spatial Design (School of Fine Arts and design), Caldas da Rainha

Design - Ceramics and Glass (School of Fine Arts and design), Caldas da Rainha

Design - Graphics and Multimedia (School of Fine Arts and design), Caldas da Rainha

Industrial Design (School of Fine Arts and design), Caldas da Rainha

Sound and Image (School of Fine Arts and design), Caldas da Rainha

Theatre (School of Fine Arts and design), Caldas da Rainha

Entrepreneurial and Juridical Sciences

Public Administration (School of Technology and Management), Leiria

Accountancy and Finance(School of Technology and Management), Leiria

Management (School of Technology and Management), Leiria

Marketing (School of Technology and Management), LeiriaHuman Relations and Organisational Communication ( School of Education and

Social Sciences), Leiria

Law Studies (Legal Counselling) (School of Technology and Management), Leiria

Education and Social Sciences

Media and Multimedia Education (School of Education and Social Sciences), Leiria

Primary Education (School of Education and Social Sciences), Leiria

Social Education (School of Education and Social Sciences), Leiria

Social Work (School of Education and Social Sciences), Leiria

Translation and Interpretation Portuguese/Chinese - Chinese/Portuguese (School of Education and Social Sciences), Leiria

Engineering and Technology

Biotechnology and Marine Biology (School of Tourism and Maritime Technology), Peniche

Biomechanics (School of Technology and Management), Leiria

Energy and Environment (School of Technology and Management), Leiria

Food Engineering (School of Tourism and Maritime Technology), Peniche

Automotive Engineering (School of Technology and Management), Leiria

Civil Engineering (School of Technology and Management), Leiria

Electrical and Electronics Engineering (School of Technology and Management), Leiria

Computer Engineering (School of Technology and Management), Leiria

Mechanical Engineering (School of Technology and Management), Leiria

Marine Resource Management* (School of Tourism and Maritime Technology), Peniche

Health Informatics (School of Technology and Management), Leiria

Civil Protection (School of Technology and Management), Leiria

Health Equipment Technology (School of Technology and Management), Leiria

Videogames and Multimedia Technology* (School of Technology and Management), Leiria

Health

Sports and Well-Being (School of Education and Social Sciences), Leiria

Dietetics* (School of Health Sciences), Leiria

Nursing (School of Health Sciences), Leiria

Nursing - Beginning in the 2nd Semestre (School of Health Sciences), Leiria

Physiotherapy (School of Health Sciences), Leiria

Speech Therapy(School of Health Sciences), Leiria

Occupational Therapy (School of Health Sciences), Leiria

Tourism

Cultural Animation (School of Education and Social Sciences), Leiria

Tourism and Recreation (School of Tourism and Maritime Technology), Peniche

Leisure Management and Business Tourism (School of Tourism and Maritime Technology), Peniche

Tourism and Hotel Management (School of Tourism and Maritime Technology), Peniche

Maritime Resources Management* (School of Tourism and Maritime Technology), Peniche

Marketing for Tourism (School of Tourism and Maritime Technology), Peniche

Restaurant Industry and Catering (School of Tourism and Maritime Technology), Peniche

Tourism (School of Tourism and Maritime Technology), Peniche

Master Degrees 

Art and Design

Fine Arts

Typography Design

Product Design

Cultural Management

Theatre

Entrepreneurial and Juridical Sciences

Business Finance

International Business

Alternative

Law Studies

Education and Communication

Speech Pathology

Pre-School Education

Pre-School Education and Primary Education

Basic Education – 1st Cycle

Basic Education – 1st and 2nd Cycle

Teaching of English and French in the Basic Education

Engineering and Technology

Aquaculture

Biotechnology of Marine Resources

Computer Engineering - Mobile Computing

Conception and Development of Products

Civil Constructions

Energy and Environment

Automotive Engineering

Automation Systems

Technology and Multimedia Communication

Telecommunication

Health

Intervention for an Active Aging

R&D Units 

Identiti(es) and Diversiti(es) Research Centre (CIID)

Centre for Rapid and Sustainable Product Development (CDRsp)

globADVANTAGE - Centre of Research on International Business & Strategy

Maritime Resources Research Group (GIRM)

Education's Investigation and Development Branch (NIDE)

Arts and Theatre Investigation Group (GIAE/C)

Sustainability Management Centre of Investigation (CIGS)

Tourism Investigation Group (GITUR)

Communications and Computer Science Research Centre (CIIC)

Human Motoricity Centre of Investigation – CIMH

Policies and Educational Systems Centre of Investigation – CIPSE

Institute for Systems and Computing Engineering

National Institute of Telecommunications – Leiria

Schools 

ESECS - Escola Superior de Educação e Ciências Sociais in Leiria
ESTG - Escola Superior de Tecnologia e Gestão in Leiria
ESAD.CR - Escola Superior de Artes e Design in Caldas da Rainha
ESTM - Escola Superior de Turismo e Tecnologia do Mar in Peniche
ESSLei - Escola Superior de Saúde in Leiria

External links 
Politécnico de Leiria
Politécnico de Leiria (English version)

Polytechnics in Portugal
Buildings and structures in Leiria
Educational institutions established in 1980
Buildings and structures in Leiria District
1980 establishments in Portugal